Orgone is an American band from Los Angeles, California. The group's sound draws from 1960s and 1970s-era funk and soul.

While several members of the band played together from the early 1990s, Orgone did not coalesce into a regular band until around 1999. Many of their early gigs were as a backing band for hip-hop musicians. After a 2001 debut release, the band added vocalist Fanny Franklin to do a cover of "Funky Nassau" by the Beginning of the End; she remained as a full-time member, although much of their music is instrumental. The group released its second album The Killion Floor in 2007, which featured "Funky Nassau" as well as covers of "Do Your Thing" by Isaac Hayes and "I Get Lifted" by Harry Wayne Casey of K.C. and the Sunshine Band. In 2010 the band opened for Sharon Jones & the Dap-Kings on tour. They have also performed at festivals like Bonnaroo and New Orleans Jazz & Heritage Festival.

Discography
 Orgone (Self-released, 2001)
 The Killion Floor (Ubiquity Records, 2007)
 Bacano (Self-released, 2008)
 Cali Fever (Ubiquity Records, 2010)
 Killion Vaults (Ubiquity Records, 2010)
 Fuzzed Up (Self-released, 2012)
 New You  (Self-released, 2013)
 Beyond The Sun (LP: Colemine Records; CD: Shanachie Records, 2015)
 Undercover Mixtape (LP/CD: Colemine Records, 2018)
 Reasons (3 Palm Records, 2019)
 Connection (3 Palm Records, 2020)
 Raw & Direct (3 Palm Records, 2020)
 Moonshadows (3 Palm Records, 2021)
 Lost Knights (3 Palm Records, 2022)

References

Links 

 Orgone official website.

American funk musical groups
Musical groups from Los Angeles
Ubiquity Records artists
Musical groups established in 1999
1999 establishments in California